Qusum may refer to:

Qusum County, county in Tibet
Qusum Town, town in Tibet

Geography of Tibet